Revamp may refer to:

Changes 
Revamp, informal term for maintenance, repair, and operations
Revamp, informal term for editing of natural-language text
Revamp (gaming), informal term for boost or renovation of a game's UI, system stats, items, rules, etc. and vice versa. Also known as buffing.

Music 
ReVamp, a progressive metal band founded by Floor Jansen, after the split up of After Forever, her former band
ReVamp (album), the self-titled debut album from the band above
Revamp, a tribute album to Elton John and Bernie Taupin